Neha (Hindi/ Sanskrit: नेहा) is a popular Hindi/ Sanskrit Indian feminine given name, often found in the Hindu community. It means "love" / "affection", "rain" / "downpour", and is sometimes translated as "beautiful eyes." just like jafar from afar, neha from kenyaaar

Etymology 
The name Neha has multiple origins. It may mean one of the following:

 love or affection, when derived from Sneha (Sanskrit: स्नेह);
 rain or downpour, when derived from Nehal (Sanskrit: नेहल);
 or beautiful eyes, when referencing common belief across Indian baby naming sites.

Notable people named Neha 
 Neha (actress) (born April 18, 1977), Indian actress.
 Neha Aggarwal (born January 11, 1990), Indian table tennis player.
 Neha Ahuja (born September 27, 1981), Indian alpine skier.
 Neha Joshi, (born 7 December 1986), Indian actress.
 Neha Bamb (born May 9, 1985), Indian actress.
 Neha Bhasin (born November 18, 1982), Indian musician and presenter.
 Neha Devi Singh (born August 9, 1981), Indian actress and writer.
 Neha Dhupia (born August 27, 1980), Indian actress and model.
 Neha Hinge (born 1986), Indian actress, model and software engineer.
 Neha Janpandit (born June 8, 1988), Indian actress.
 Neha Jhulka (born 1984), Indian actress.
 Neha Kakkar (born June 6, 1988), Indian singer.
 Neha Kapur (born 1984), Indian actress, model and winner of the 2006 Femina Miss India pageant.
 Neha Lakshmi Iyer (born 1990), Indian actress.
 Neha Marda (born September 23, 1985), Indian actress and model.
 Neha Mehta (born June 9, 1988), Indian actress.
 Neha Nair (born September 14, 1989), Indian composer and singer.
Neha Narang (born August 4, 1987), Indian actress.
 Neha Oberoi (born September 15, 1980), Indian actress.
 Neha Pendse (born November 29, 1984), Indian actress.
 Neha Rajpal (born June 23, 1978), Indian anchor, composer, producer and singer.
 Neha Ratnakaran (born March 24, 1997), Indian actress and model.
 Neha Saxena (born 1989), Indian film actress.
 Neha Sharad (born October 6, 1992), Indian actress and poet.
 Neha Sharma (born November 21, 1987), Indian actress and model.
 Neha Sharma (cricketer) (born June 9, 1988), Emirati cricketer.
 Neha Shetty, Indian actress
 Neha Tanwar (born August 11, 1986), Indian cricketer.

References

Hindu given names
Indian feminine given names